Cliff House in Manitou Springs, Colorado is a Queen Anne style hotel in the Manitou Springs Historic District. It is a National Register of Historic Places listing. The Cliff House at Pikes Peak is a member of Historic Hotels of America, the official program of the National Trust for Historic Preservation.

History
Mr. Webster and Mr. Shurtleff, entrepreneurs from Canada, provided the investment to build Cliff House, the second largest hotel in Manitou Springs in 1874. It is located near the Soda and Navajo Springs. Before its addition, sometime after 1874, the hotel could serve up to 100 people.

The hotel, once a stagecoach stop, was visited by Clark Gable and Theodore Roosevelt.

Gallery

See also
 List of Historic Hotels of America

Notes

References

External links

 Cliff House (official site)

Hotel buildings on the National Register of Historic Places in Colorado
Colorado State Register of Historic Properties
Manitou Springs, Colorado
National Register of Historic Places in El Paso County, Colorado
Historic Hotels of America